M. Cristina Alcade is a Marie Rich Endowed Professor of Women's and Gender Studies at the University of Kentucky. She is also the Associate Dean of Inclusion and Internationalization in the College of Arts and Sciences at the university. She is also an affiliate faculty member in the Social Theory, Latin American, Caribbean, and Latino Studies, and Anthropology departments and works with the Center for Research on Violence Against Women. Her research focuses on gender violence, migration, exclusion, and race and racialization.

Education 
Alcalde earned her Masters of Arts (1999) and Ph.D (2003) at Indiana University Bloomington in Latin American Studies and anthropology, respectively.

Research 
Alcalde researches domestic violence, particularly in Peru, her home country, and on the "interconnections among intimate, institutional, and structural violence in Peru and among Latinos in the U.S., as well as on masculinities and motherhood". She finds that the responsibility of preventing domestic violence and protecting those who are being abused does not belong to any one person or institution, and it includes the police, the prosecutors office, ministries, courts, and the public.

Bibliography 

 2018: Peruvian Lives across Borders: Power, Exclusion, and Home. University of Illinois Press.
 2015: Provocations: A Transnational Reader in the History of Feminist Thought. Co-editor, with Susan Bordo and Ellen Rosenman. University of California Press.
 2014: La mujer en la violencia: Género, pobreza, y resistencia en el Perú. Lima: Instituto de Estudios Peruanos and Fondo Editorial de la Pontificia Universidad Católica del Perú.  (Spanish edition of The Woman in the Violence)
 2010: The Woman in the Violence: Gender, Poverty, and Resistance in Peru. Nashville: Vanderbilt University Press.
 2008: Visión del Perú de académicos peruanos en Estados Unidos (Vision of Peru of Peruvian Academics in the United States). Co-editor, with Joseph Zavala. Lima: Academia Diplomática del Perú.

References

External links 
 Dr. Alcade's faculty profile
 Academia profile
 
 

Year of birth missing (living people)
Living people
University of Kentucky faculty
Indiana University Bloomington alumni
University of Louisville alumni
Activists from Kentucky
American women anthropologists
Peruvian women's rights activists
Peruvian women activists
21st-century Peruvian women writers
Peruvian women essayists
Peruvian American
Peruvian emigrants to the United States
American women academics
21st-century American women